The Jensen GT is a British sports car. It was introduced by Jensen Motors in 1975 as the shooting-brake version of the Jensen-Healey. The new configuration was a 2+2 design with a very limited back seat. Aside from the body shape and seating, relatively little differed from the roadster. Acceleration and top speed were slightly reduced due to the increased weight and additional smog control components on the engine.

During its short production run from September 1975 until May 1976, 511 Jensen GTs were built before Jensen Motors went into receivership.

Gallery

References 
 Bibliography
 
 

 Notes

GT
Sports cars
Cars introduced in 1975